The 1901 Carlisle Indians football team represented the Carlisle Indian Industrial School as an independent during the 1901 college football season. Led by third-year head coach Pop Warner, the Indians compiled a 5–7–1 record and was outscored by a total of 168 to 134.

Two Carlisle players received honors from Walter Camp on the 1901 All-America team: Martin Wheelock as a second-team tackle and Jimmy Johnson as a third-team quarterback. Johnson was posthumously inducted into the College Football Hall of Fame in 1969.

Carlisle was one of three Native American schools in 1901 to field football teams that competed in college football.  The other two were Haskell (6–2) in Kansas and Chilocco (2–5) in the Oklahoma Territory.

Schedule

Season summary

Week 4: vs. Dickinson
Despite the 16 to 11 Carlisle victory, The Dickinsonian called it "the greatest day in the football history of Dickinson."

Week 9: at Michigan
The national champion Michigan Wolverines defeated the Carlisle Indians, 22–0, in a game played at Bennett Park in Detroit on November 2. The game was watched by a crowd of 8,000 spectators that included China's Minister to the United States, Wu Ting-Fan, occupying a box with former United States Secretary of War, Russell A. Alger.

Week 13: at Columbia

The Columbia Lions rolled up their largest score of the season, defeating the Indians 40 to 12. It was 40 to 0 until the final five minutes. Starring in the contest was Columbia's backfield of Bill Morley, Harold Weekes, Dick Smith, and Chauncey L. Berrien.

References

Carlisle
Carlisle Indians football seasons
Carlisle Indians football